The Nathaniel Smithson House is a property in Peytonsville, Tennessee, which was listed on the National Register of Historic Places in 1988.

The house is a two-story brick central passage plan house, built c. 1840.  The front facade has brick is laid in Flemish bond and a one-story Italianate-style porch added in c. 1880.  Brick elsewhere is laid in five course common bond.

A one-story frame smokehouse built c. 1880, behind the main house, is the second contributing building. A one-story c.1900 frame building which served as a store elsewhere was moved to the property later was deemed non-contributing.

The NRHP eligibility of the property was covered in a 1988 study of Williamson County historical resources.

References

Central-passage houses in Tennessee
Houses completed in 1840
Houses in Williamson County, Tennessee
Houses on the National Register of Historic Places in Tennessee
Italianate architecture in Tennessee
National Register of Historic Places in Williamson County, Tennessee